Lota Bowen (1872–1935) was a British painter. She was a member of the Society of Women Artists (and its sometime president), the Society of Painters in Tempera, and the 91 Art Club, a Chelsea club for women artists. Born in Armley, Yorkshire, she studied in Ludovici's studio London; later in Rome under Santoro and in the night classes of the Circolo Artistico. Her pictures are principally landscapes and mainly in private collections. Among the most noted are: On the Venetian Lagoons; Old Stone Pines, Lido, Venice; Evening on Lake Lugano; Evening Glow Dolomites; The Old Bird Fancier; and Moonrise on Crowborough, Sussex; all exhibited at the Royal Academy. She also painted portraits and figure subjects and was noted for her "broad swinging brush and great love of 'tone'".

References 

1872 births
1935 deaths
19th-century British painters
20th-century British painters
Artists from Leeds